Kabara (pronounced ) is an island of Fiji, a member of the Lau archipelago.

The islanders are noted for their craftsmanship in the area of wood carving.  Vesi wood (Intsia bijuga), which grows natively on Kabara, is the traditional material, but deforestation has stripped the island, leaving only 8% of the island covered with Vesi trees.  A program of reforestation has been started, but as Vesi trees take 70–80 years to mature, carvers are being encouraged to use as little Vesi wood as possible.  Sandalwood, known locally as yasi, is being promoted as an alternative.  Unlike Vesi, sandalwood takes only 30–40 years to mature.

The Fiji Village news service reported on 28 March 2006 that the World Wide Fund for Nature had donated thirteen 5000-gallon water tanks to Kabara, which would likely eliminate water shortages on the island.

A notable native from Kabara was the late wood carver Jone Lupe, whose family have been engaged in the craft for generations.

References 

Islands of Fiji
Lau Islands